The 2014 ITF Women's Circuit – Wuhan was a professional tennis tournament played on outdoor hard courts. It was the first edition of the tournament which was part of the 2014 ITF Women's Circuit, offering a total of $50,000 in prize money. It took place in Wuhan, China, on 28 July–3 August 2014.

Singles main draw entrants

Seeds 

 1 Rankings as of 21 July 2014

Other entrants 
The following players received wildcards into the singles main draw:
  Tang Haochen
  Wang Yafan
  Zhang Kailin
  Zhang Yuxuan

The following players received entry from the qualifying draw:
  Kyoka Okamura
  Tamarine Tanasugarn
  Tian Ran
  Yang Zhaoxuan

The following player received entry into the singles main draw as a lucky loser:
  Hu Yueyue

Champions

Singles 

  Wang Qiang def.  Luksika Kumkhum 6–2, 6–2

Doubles 

  Han Xinyun /  Zhang Kailin def.  Miyu Kato /  Makoto Ninomiya 6–4, 6–2

External links 
 Official website
 2014 ITF Women's Circuit – Wuhan at ITFtennis.com

Wuhan
Wuhan World Tennis Tour
2014 in Chinese tennis